The Wall – Live in Berlin was a live concert performance by Roger Waters and numerous guest artists, of the Pink Floyd studio album The Wall, itself largely written by Waters during his time with the band. The show was held in Berlin on 21 July 1990, to commemorate the fall of the Berlin Wall eight months earlier. A live album of the concert was released 21 August 1990. A video of the concert was also commercially released.

History

The concert was staged on vacant terrain between Potsdamer Platz and the Brandenburg Gate, a location that was part of the former "no man's land" of the Berlin Wall.

"I did an interview a couple of years ago for a guy called Redbeard…" Waters recalled. "He said, 'Would you ever perform The Wall again on stage?' And I said, 'No'… Indoors, it made no sense financially; it's too expensive. And, as it's partially an attack on the inherently greedy nature of stadium rock shows, it would be wrong to do it in stadiums… I said, 'Well, I might do it outdoors if they ever take the wall down in Berlin.'… The Memorial Fund was in a council meeting, and felt they needed some kind of an event to focus attention on it… So I agreed to have a meeting with Leonard Cheshire. And I was very impressed, and said I would do what I could, although I thought it was very unlikely that it would come off… Then, in November [1989], when the wall started coming down, we started negotiating."

The event was produced and cast by British impresario and producer Tony Hollingsworth. It was staged partly at Waters' expense. While he subsequently earned the money back from the sale of the CD and video releases of the album, the original plan was to donate all profits past his initial investment to the Memorial Fund for Disaster Relief, a UK charity founded by Leonard Cheshire. However, audio and video sales came in significantly under projections, and the trading arm of the charity (Operation Dinghy) incurred heavy losses. A few years later, the charity was wound up, and the audio and video sales rights from the concert performance returned to Waters.

The production was designed by Mark Fisher and Jonathan Park. Most of the wall was built before the show and the rest was built progressively through the first part of the show. The wall was then knocked down at the end of the show.

Waters tried to get guests like Peter Gabriel, Bruce Springsteen and Eric Clapton but they were either unavailable or turned it down. Rod Stewart, who was to sing "Young Lust", and Joe Cocker were confirmed but, when the planned concert date was put back, both were unavailable. "To sell the idea to TV, I had to get people to commit themselves and it very nearly killed me," Waters recalled. "The likes of Joni Mitchell and Bryan Adams were prepared to say 'Yes' from the start, but there were so many others who were just waiting to see who else was involved before they made up their minds." 

In the 1989 interview with Redbeard, Waters stated, "I might even let Dave play guitar." On 30 June 1990 – during an interview before Pink Floyd's performance at Knebworth '90 – Gilmour responded to Roger's statement on an interview with Kurt Loder on MTV by saying that he "and the rest of Pink Floyd (Nick Mason and Rick Wright) had been given the legal go-ahead to perform with Roger but had not been contacted" and "he never asked us" (in a fake crying voice) with Nick Mason saying "if only that phone can ring". Two days later, on 2 July 1990 Waters appeared on the American rock radio call-in show Rockline and contradicted his Gilmour invite by saying, "I don't know where Dave got that idea".

In the end, Hollingsworth (with Waters assisting) brought in guest artists including Snowy White, Rick Danko, Levon Helm and Garth Hudson of The Band, The Hooters, Van Morrison, Sinéad O'Connor, Cyndi Lauper, Marianne Faithfull, Scorpions, Joni Mitchell, Paul Carrack, Thomas Dolby and Bryan Adams, along with actors Albert Finney, Jerry Hall, Tim Curry and Ute Lemper. Leonard Cheshire opened the concert by blowing a World War I whistle.

This performance had several differences from Pink Floyd's original production of The Wall show. Both "Mother" and "Another Brick in the Wall, Part II" (like in the 1980/81 concerts) were extended with solos by various instruments and the latter had a cold ending. "In The Flesh" (also like the 1980/81 concerts) has an extended intro, and "Comfortably Numb" featured dueling solos by the two guitarists as well as an additional chorus at the end of the song. "The Show Must Go On" is omitted completely, while both "The Last Few Bricks" and "What Shall We Do Now?" are included ("The Last Few Bricks" was shortened). Also, the performance of the song "The Trial" had live actors playing the parts, with Thomas Dolby playing the part of the teacher hanging from the wall, Tim Curry as the prosecutor, and Albert Finney as the Judge. The repeated proclamation of "Tear down the wall!" and subsequent destruction of the on-stage wall was for this show accompanied by a projection of a section of the actual Berlin Wall on the cardboard bricks used on stage. The show officially ended with "The Tide Is Turning", a song from Waters' then-recent solo album Radio K.A.O.S. The Wall's original closing number, "Outside the Wall," was affixed to the end of "The Tide is Turning."

The Wall – Live in Berlin was released as a live recording of the concert, and the Laserdisc video in NTSC can still be found through second sourcing. A DVD was released in 2003 in the U.S. by Island/Mercury Records and internationally by Universal Music (Region-free).

Hollingsworth's company Tribute, a London-based "good causes" campaign company, sold worldwide television rights, with 52 countries showing the two-hour event. Twenty countries showed up to five repeats of the show and 65 countries broadcast a highlights show. There was also distribution of a double music CD and post-production VHS videotape by Polygram.

Setlist

Personnel

The Company
Roger Waters – vocals, bass guitar, acoustic guitar on "Mother", rhythm guitar on "Hey You"
Scorpions:
Klaus Meine – lead vocals, tambourine
Rudolf Schenker – rhythm guitar, backing vocals
Matthias Jabs – lead guitar, backing vocals
Francis Buchholz – bass guitar, backing vocals
Herman Rarebell – drums, backing vocals
Ute Lemper – vocals
Cyndi Lauper – percussion, vocals
Thomas Dolby – keytar, vocals
Sinéad O'Connor – vocals
The Band:
Rick Danko – vocals
Levon Helm – vocals
Garth Hudson – accordion, soprano saxophone
The Hooters:
Eric Bazilian – guitar, vocals
Rob Hyman – keyboards, vocals
John Lilley – guitar, vocals
Fran Smith Jr. – bass guitar, vocals
David Uosikkinen – drums
Joni Mitchell – vocals
James Galway – flute
Bryan Adams – guitar, vocals
Jerry Hall – vocals
Paul Carrack – vocals
Van Morrison – vocals
Tim Curry – vocals
Marianne Faithfull – vocals
Albert Finney – vocals

The Bleeding Heart Band
Rick Di Fonzo – guitars
Snowy White – guitars
Andy Fairweather-Low – bass guitar, guitar, backing vocals
Peter Wood – keyboards, organ, synthesizers
Nick Glennie-Smith – keyboards, organ, synthesizers
Graham Broad – drums, electronic percussion
Stan Farber – backing vocals, percussion (credited as Jim Farber)
Joe Chemay – backing vocals
Jim Haas – backing vocals, percussion
John Joyce – backing vocals

Others
The Rundfunk Orchestra, directed by Michael Kamen.
The Rundfunk Choir.
The Marching Band of the Combined Soviet Forces in Germany (alternatingly credited on the 2003 reissue DVD as The Military Orchestra of the Soviet Army) and the Red Army Chorus.
Paddy Moloney (member of The Chieftains. Listed in album credits, contribution was the tin whistle playing throughout the concert.)

Performance notes
 The Wife's part of "The Trial" was reshot at London's Brixton Academy after the original sequence was deemed to be of insufficient quality due to camera shake. What is seen in the video issue is a close-up of Ute Lemper, shot against a dark background, lip-syncing to the original live sound.
 Shot on Potsdamer Platz, the no man's land between East and West Berlin, the producers didn't know if the area would be filled with mines. Before setting up, they did a sweep of the area and found a cache of munitions and a previously unknown SS Leibstandarte Adolf Hitler bunker.
The live Van Morrison version of "Comfortably Numb" is used in the Martin Scorsese film The Departed. It is later used in HBO's The Sopranos. Morrison also performed this version on his 2008 concerts.

Charts

Certifications

Video

References

External links

Mark Fisher's "The Wall in Berlin" gallery
 

Roger Waters live albums
Albums produced by Roger Waters
The Wall (rock opera)
1990 live albums
Berlin Wall in popular culture
Albums produced by Nick Griffiths

de:The Wall#Geschichte